Kangwon Province (Kangwŏndo) is a province of North Korea, with its capital at Wŏnsan. Before the division of Korea in 1945, Kangwŏn Province and its South Korean neighbour Gangwon Province (also spelled Kangwon Province sometimes) formed a single province that excluded Wŏnsan.

History
Kangwŏn was one of the Eight Provinces of Korea during the Joseon Dynasty. The province was formed 1395, and derived its name from the names of the principal cities of Gangneung (or Kangnŭng;) and the provincial capital Wonju (or Wŏnju;).

In 1895, Kangwŏn was replaced by the Districts of Chuncheon (Chuncheon-bu;) in the west and Gangneung (Gangneung-bu;) in the east. Wonju became part of Chungju District.During the japanese rule of korea, it was known as Kōgen-dō.

In 1896, Korea was redivided into thirteen provinces, and the two districts were merged to re-form Kangwŏn Province. Although Wonju rejoined Kangwŏn province, the provincial capital was moved to Chuncheon.

In 1945, Kangwŏn Province (along with the rest of Korea) was divided by the 38th parallel north in 1945 into Soviet and American zones of occupation in the north and south respectively. In 1946, the northern province was expanded to include the North Korean portion of Gyeonggi Province and the area around Wŏnsan in South Hamgyŏng Province. The provincial capital of the North Korean portion of the province was established at Wŏnsan, as Kangwŏn's traditional capitals Wonju and Chuncheon both were south of the 38th parallel. In 1948, the province became part of the new Democratic People's Republic of Korea. As a result of the Korean War Armistice Agreement of 1953, the boundary between the North and South Korean portions of the province was shifted northward to the Military Demarcation Line.

In 2002, Mount Kumgang Tourist Region was split off from the rest of the province to form a separately-administered region.

Geography
The province is bordered by South Hamgyŏng to the north, South P'yŏngan and North Hwanghae to the west, and Kaesŏng to the south. Additionally, the province is across the Korean Demilitarized Zone from its South Korean counterpart Gangwon and Gyeonggi. To the east is the Sea of Japan.

The province is dominated by the T'aebaek Mountains, the highest peak of which is Mount Kumgang ("Diamond Mountain").

Kangwŏn and Gangwon Provinces are together referred to as the Gwandong region. The region west of the Taebaek Mountains is called Yŏngsŏ, while the region east of the mountains is called Yŏngdong.

In April 2003, the Mt. Chuae Plant Reserve was created. The reserve is 687 hectares and is in Shindong-ri, Sepho County, and Sanyang-ri, Kosan County. Mt. Chuae is 1,528 meters above sea level and is part of the Masingnyong Mountains. The DPRK Nature Conservation Union is trying to preserve mixed forests of pine and broad-leaf trees. The DPRK Cabinet-level decision has banned animal grazing and collecting plant resources and other acts of damaging the environment.

Administrative divisions
Kangwŏn Province is divided into 2 cities (si), 1 special administrative region, and 15 counties (kun).

Cities

 Munchŏn-si
 Wŏnsan-si

Counties 
 Anbyŏn-gun
 Ch'angdo-gun
 Ch'ŏnnae-gun
 Ch'ŏrwŏn-gun
 Hoeyang-gun
 Ich'ŏn-gun
 Kimhwa-gun
 Kosan-gun
 Kosŏng-gun
 Kŭmgang-gun
 Mount Kumgang Tourist Region
 P'an'gyo-gun
 Pŏptong-gun
 P'yŏnggang-gun
 Sep'o-gun
 T'ongch'ŏn-gun

References

External links
 Seoul City history article on Hanseong and 22 other late 19th-century districts (in Korean)

 
Provinces of North Korea